The West Irondequoit Central School District is a public school district in New York State that serves approximately 4000 students in the western half of the town of Irondequoit in Monroe County, with over 600 employees and an operating budget of $82.4 million (~$20,319 per student).

The average class size is 21 students and the student-teacher ratio is 13.6:1(elementary), 13.6:1(middle-high school).

The District motto is "Peak Performance".

Dr. Aaron Johnson is the Superintendent of Schools.

History
A high school building was erected in 1924 as the Irondequoit Free Union School, District Number 3. In 1953, District Number 3 and District Number 4 combined to become the West Irondequoit Central School District.

Board of education
The Board of Education (BOE) consists of 7 members who serve rotating 3-year terms. Elections are held each May for board members and to vote on the School District Budget. Student representatives, elected by the student body for 1-year terms, also attend BOE meetings; their vote is unofficial.

Current board members are:
Matthew Metras, President
Matthew Sullivan, Vice President
Justin Connor
Ann Cunningham
Courtney Shouse
Rosa Vargas-Cronin
John Vay

Schools

Elementary school
Briarwood Elementary School (K-3), Principal - Brenna Farrell 
Brookview Elementary School (K-3), Principal - Alicia Spitz
Colebrook Elementary School (K-3), Principal - Brenna Farrell 
Listwood Elementary School (K-3), Principal - Gayle Pavone
Seneca Elementary (K-3), Principal - Alicia Spitz
Southlawn Elementary (K-3), Principal - Gayle Pavone

Middle school
Iroquois Middle School (4-6), Principal - Christian Zwahlen
Rogers Middle School (4-6), Principal - Dr. Christine Brown-Richards

High school
Dake Junior High School (7-8), Principal - Dave Dunn, Joyce Akwaa, Nicholas DiMartino
Irondequoit High School (9-12), Principal - Alecia Zipp-McLaughlin

Reorganization
To improve K-3 achievement, the administration of the elementary schools changed in July 2007 one principal per school to one principal for each pair of schools: Briarwood/Colebrook, Brookview/Seneca and Listwood/Southlawn.

References

External links

York State School Boards Association

Education in Monroe County, New York
School districts in New York (state)
School districts established in 1953